Moshe Levin (1897–1943), alias 'Batlan' and 'Elisha', was a Jewish socialist. He was a member of the Jewish Communist Party (Poalei Zion) in Russia, before arriving in Palestine in 1919, where he joined the Socialist Workers Party. Levin contested on the 1920 Histadrut election on the list of the party, under the alias 'L. Elisha'. When the party was divided in 1922, he became a leader of the Palestinian Communist Party, along with Menachem 'Oskar' Finkelstein. After the reunification of the party into the Palestine Communist Party, he voiced opposition towards the 'Arabization' efforts inside the party. In 1928 he was deported to Poland. During the Second World War, he shifted his residence to the Soviet Union.

References

Russian socialists
Russian Jews
1943 deaths
1897 births
Socialist Workers Party (Mandatory Palestine) politicians
Palestine Communist Party politicians
Jewish socialists
World War II refugees
Soviet emigrants to Mandatory Palestine